Barrales is a surname. Notable people with the surname include:

Alejandra Barrales (born 1967), Mexican lawyer and politician
Ernesto Javier Gómez Barrales (born 1978), Mexican politician
Jerónimo Barrales (born 1987), Argentine footballer
Ruben Barrales (born 1962), American bureaucrat

See also
Barralet